The Pashupatastra (IAST: Pāśupatāstra, Sanskrit:  पाशुपतास्त्र; the weapon of Pashupati, an epithet of Shiva) is an astra, a celestial missile, affiliated to the Hindu deity Shiva, as well as Kali and Adi Parashakti, which can be discharged by the mind, the eyes, words, or a bow.

Description 
Never to be used against lesser enemies or by lesser warriors, the Pashupatastra is capable of destroying creation and vanquishing all beings. In the Mahabharata, Arjuna, and in the Ramayana, only the sage Vishvamitra, Indrajit and Rama possessed the Pashupatastra. It is one of the six Mantramukta weapons that cannot be resisted.

Literature

Mahabharata 
After the battle at the Khandava forest, Indra had promised Arjuna to give him all his weapons, as a boon for matching him in battle, with the requirement that Shiva should be appeased by him. Following the advice of Krishna to undertake a tapasya to attain this divine weapon, Arjuna left his brothers for the performance of a penance.

On learning about Arjuna's penance, Duryodhana sent the asura Mukasura to kill Arjuna. Mukasura took the form of a wild boar to interrupt Arjuna's worship. Upon knowing this, Shiva appeared there, in the form of a hunter. Arjuna shot an arrow at the boar, and slew it. At the same time, Shiva (in the disguise of a kirata) had also released an arrow from his bow. A scuffle arose between the two as to whose arrow had slain the boar. The scuffle led to an exchange of arrow-fire, until Arjuna's quiver was depleted. The Pandava struck the hunter's head with his sword, which shattered to pieces. The two exchanged blows, until Arjuna was beaten senseless against the earth.

Shiva, and his consort, Parvati, offered their darshana to Arjuna, and blessed him with the Pashupatastra.

See also
 Brahmastra
 Narayanastra
 Astra (weapon)
Kirātārjunīya, a 6th-century epic poem describing Arjuna’s penance

References

Resources
Dictionary of Hindu Lore and Legend by Anna Dallapiccola

Weapons in Hindu mythology
Mahabharata